The Virgin Reliquaries are four 1434 panel paintings by Fra Giovanni Masi after drawings by Fra Angelico, intended as tabernacle-reliquaries for the Convent of Santa Maria Novella. One is in the Isabella Stewart Gardner Museum in Boston (Death and Assumption of the Virgin) whilst the rest are in the Museo nazionale di San Marco in Florence.

References

Paintings of the Assumption of the Virgin
Paintings of the Coronation of the Virgin
Paintings by Fra Angelico
Paintings in the collection of the Museo Nazionale di San Marco
Paintings of the Lamentation of Christ
Paintings of the Madonna and Child
Adoration of the Magi in art
Paintings depicting the Annunciation
Paintings in the collection of the Isabella Stewart Gardner Museum
1434 paintings